On 6 August 2016, 14 youths were killed in a fire at the Cuba Libre bar in Rouen, Normandy, France.

Event
The fire started shortly before 00:50 on 6 August, when firefighters were called to the Cuba Libre bar in Rouen. The bar was hosting a private birthday party. The fire was initially reported as being caused by an "accidental explosion," but this was subsequently refuted by the local authority. The blaze took 30 minutes to put out.

Rouen's Vice Prosecutor Laurent Labadie told The Associated Press that the first testimonies from survivors and early results from the police investigation indicated that the "fire was completely accidental." "There was no explosion," Labadie told the AP. "Candles on a birthday cake started the fire after the person who carried it tripped on the stairs leading to the basement."

The candle flames are believed to have set the polystyrene ceiling tiles of the basement ceiling alight. It is expected that most deaths were caused by toxic smoke inhalation, although at this time no autopsies have been carried out to confirm the individual causes of death.

References

2016 disasters in France
2016 fires in Europe
21st century in Normandy
August 2016 events in France
Building and structure fires in France
2016 fire
Restaurant fires